I Ketut Mahendra (born April 27, 1987) is an Indonesian footballer who plays for PSM Makassar in the Indonesia Premier League as a defender.

External links 
  
 

Indonesian footballers
Living people
1987 births
Association football defenders